Chief Saetta (Italian: Caporal Saetta) is a 1924 Italian silent adventure film directed by Eugenio Perego and starring Domenico Gambino and Pauline Polaire. It was part of a series featuring Gambino as the strongman Saetta. Produced by Fert Film of Turin, it still exists in film archives.

Cast
 Liliana Ardea 
 Augusto Bandini
 Oreste Bilancia
 Domenico Gambino
 Felice Minotti
 Pauline Polaire
 Franz Sala
 Domenico Serra

References

Bibliography 
 Jacqueline Reich. The Maciste Films of Italian Silent Cinema. Indiana University Press, 2015.

External links 
 

1924 films
Italian adventure films
Italian silent feature films
1920s Italian-language films
Films directed by Eugenio Perego
1924 adventure films
Italian black-and-white films
Silent adventure films
1920s Italian films